The 2023 VCU Rams baseball team will represent Virginia Commonwealth University during the 2023 NCAA Division I baseball season. The Rams played their home games at The Diamond as a member of the Atlantic 10 Conference. They will be led by head coach Bradley LeCroy, in his first season with the program.

Previous season

The 2022 VCU Rams baseball team notched a 42–20 (19–5) regular season record. VCU successfully defended their tournament championship, winning the 2022 Atlantic 10 Conference baseball tournament over Richmond, and qualified for the NCAA tournament for the second year in a row. They were seeded number three in the Chapel Hill Regional. There, they defeated Georgia and then North Carolina in the opening round, before losing two straight to North Carolina. Upon the end of the season, VCU head coach, Shawn Stiffler resigned to become the head coach for Notre Dame.

Preseason

Preseason Atlantic 10 awards and honors
Austin Younce was named the Atlantic 10 Preseason Freshman of the Year, while Will Carlone, and Campbell Ellis were named to the All-Atlantic 10 Preseason team.

Coaches poll 
The Atlantic 10 baseball coaches' poll was released on February 7, 2023. VCU was picked to finish second the Atlantic 10.

Personnel

Starters

Roster

Coaching staff

Offseason

Departures

Transfers

Signing Day Recruits
The following players signed National Letter of Intents to play for VCU in 2023.

2022 MLB Draft

Game log 

Schedule Notes

Statistics

Team batting

Team pitching

Individual batting 
Note: leaders must meet the minimum requirement of 2 PA/G and 75% of games played

Individual pitching
Note: leaders must meet the minimum requirement of 1 IP/G

Source:

Rankings

References 

Vcu
VCU Rams baseball seasons
VCU Rams baseball
VCU Rams baseball